Fernando is a Spanish and Portuguese given name and a surname common in Spain, Portugal, Italy, France, Switzerland, former Spanish or Portuguese colonies in Latin America, Africa, the Philippines, India, and Sri Lanka. It is equivalent to the Germanic given name Ferdinand, with an original meaning of "adventurous, bold journey".

First name

 Fernando el Católico, king of Aragon

A
 Fernando Acevedo, Peruvian track and field athlete 
 Fernando Aceves Humana, Mexican painter
 Fernando Alegría, Chilean poet and writer
 Fernando Alonso, Spanish Formula One driver
 Fernando Amorebieta, Venezuelan footballer
 Fernando Amorsolo, Filipino painter
 Fernando Antogna, Argentine track and road cyclist
 Fernando de Araújo (disambiguation), multiple people

B
 Fernando Balzaretti (1946–1998), Mexican actor
 Fernando Baudrit Solera, Costa Rican president of the supreme court
 Fernando Botero, Colombian artist
 Fernando Bujones, ballet dancer

C
 Fernando Cabrera (baseball), MLB pitcher
 Fernando Cabrita, Portuguese footballer and manager
 Fernando Camargo, Colombian road cyclist
 Fernando Chui Sai On, Macanese statesman; current Chief Executive of Macau 
 Fernando Climent, Spanish rower
 Fernando Collor de Mello, Brazilian former president
 Fernando Colunga, Mexican actor
 Fernando Cortez, Major League Baseball Player

D
 Fernando Delgadillo, Mexican singer

F
 Fernando Fernán Gómez, Spanish film actor and director
 Fernando Fernández (disambiguation), multiple people
 Fernando Francisco Reges, Brazilian footballer

G
 Fernando Gago, Argentine footballer
 Fernando Gallego, Spanish painter
 Fernando García (disambiguation), multiple people
 Fernando González (disambiguation), multiple people

H
 Fernando Haddad, Brazilian politician
 Fernando Henrique Cardoso, Brazilian former president
 Fernando Hierro, Spanish footballer

J
 Fernando Jácome, Colombian freestyle swimmer

L
 Fernando Lamas, Argentine actor and director
 Fernando Larraín, Chilean actor and comedian
 Fernando Llorente, Spanish footballer
 Fernando Lopez, Filipino statesman
 Fernando de Lucia, Italian tenor
 Fernando Luiz Roza, Brazilian footballer

M
 Fernando de Magallanes (Ferdinand Magellan), Portuguese explorer who organized the first circumnavigation of the world
 Fernando de Melo Viana, Brazilian politician
 Fernando de Moraes, Brazilian footballer
 Fernando Martínez Perales, Spanish footballer
 Fernando Lucas Martins, Brazilian footballer
 Fernando Meirelles, Brazilian film director
 Fernando Montiel, Mexican boxer
 Fernando Morales (disambiguation), multiple people
 Fernando Morán, Spanish footballer
 Fernando Morán, Spanish politician
 Fernando Moresi, Argentine field hockey player
 Fernando Morientes, Spanish footballer

O
 Fernando Ochoaizpur, Bolivian footballer
 Fernando Ortiz (disambiguation), multiple people

P
 Fernando Pérez (disambiguation), multiple people
 Fernando Pessoa, Portuguese poet and writer
 Fernando Pileggi, Brazilian footballer
 Fernando Poe Sr., Filipino actor
 Fernando Poe Jr., Filipino actor

Q
 Fernando Quintanilla, Spanish footballer

R
 Fernando Rech, Brazilian footballer
 Fernando Redondo, Argentine footballer
 Fernando Retayud, Colombian boxer
 Fernando Ricksen (1976–2019), Dutch footballer
 Fernando Rielo, Spanish poet and philosopher
 Fernando Rodney, Baseball player

S
 Fernando Serrano, Colombian statesman
 Fernando Solabarrieta, Chilean journalist
 Fernando dos Santos Pedro, Brazilian footballer
 Fernando Soler, Mexican film actor and director
Fernando Sor, Spanish classical guitarist and composer

T
 Fernando Tatis Jr., dominican professional baseball shortstop
 Fernando Torres, Spanish footballer

V
 Fernando Valades, Mexican composer, pianist and singer
 Fernando Valenzuela, MLB pitcher
 Fernando Vargas, Mexican American boxer
 Fernando Verdasco, Spanish tennis player
 Fernando Vergara, Chilean footballer and manager

Z
 Fernando Zóbel de Ayala y Montojo, Filipino painter
 Fernando Zobel de Ayala, Filipino businessman

Surname

A
 Akshu Fernando (born 1991), Sri Lankan cricket batsman who plays for Panadura
 Andibuduge Walter Fernando, 7th Commander of the Sri Lanka Air Force
 Austin Fernando, Sri Lankan Sinhala civil servant

B
 Basil Fernando, Sri Lankan jurist, author, poet, human rights activist
 Bayani Fernando (born 1946), Filipino politician
 Benny Fernando (born 1969), Sri Lankan Sinhala Olympic long jumper
 Bruno Fernando (born 1998), American basketball player

C
 Chandra Fernando, (1942–1988), Sri Lankan Tamil Roman Catholic priest and human rights activist
 Charitha Buddhika (also known as Buddika Fernando) (born 1980), Sri Lankan international cricketer (2001–03)
 Chitra Fernando (1935–1998), Sri Lankan female writer and critic
 Clancy Fernando (1938–1992), Sri Lankan admiral and Commander of the Sri Lanka Navy
 C. H. Fernando (born 1930), Sri Lankan Sinhala general
 C. T. Fernando (1921–1977), Sri Lankan musician

D
 Damian Fernando (born 1982), Sri Lankan cricketer
 Dampath Fernando, Sri Lankan Sinhala Major General
 Devaka Fernando, Sri Lankan born Physician and academic
 Dilhara Fernando (born 1979), Sri Lankan cricketer
 Dinesh Fernando, Sri Lankan cricketer
 Dinusha Fernando (born 1979), Sri Lankan cricketer
 Don Fernando (born 1948), actor and director
 D. T. Fernando, Sri Lankan lyricist

E
 Elmo Fernando, Sri Lankan announcer with Radio Ceylon 
 Eric Fernando, SLBC English-language broadcaster

F
 Frank Marcus Fernando (1931–2009), Sri Lankan Roman Catholic Bishop of Chilaw

G
 Gratien Fernando (1915–1942), Sri Lankan mutineer

H
 Hasantha Fernando, Sri Lankan cricketer
 Hemasiri Fernando, Vice President of Commonwealth Games Federation, Chairman of the National Olympic Committee of Sri Lanka
 Herbert Fernando, Sri Lankan cricketer
 Hugh Fernando (1916-1993), Sri Lankan Sinhala politician born in Nainamadama
 Hugh Norman Gregory Fernando (1910–1976), 33rd Chief Justice of Sri Lanka
 Hugo Fernando (1912–1999), Sri Lankan film personality
 Hemajith Fernando (1945-2021), Senior Journalist and Prime Minister's media coordinator

J
 Janaprith Fernando (born 1967), Sri Lankan scout
 Johnston Fernando, Sri Lankan politician
 Joseph Peter Moraes Fernando, known as Premnath Moraes (1923-1998), Sri Lankan Tamil actor, director, and screenwriter

K
 Kenneth Fernando, Former Anglican bishop of Colombo, Sri Lanka

L
 Lalithamana Fernando (born 1962), Sri Lankan cricketer
 Leo Fernando (1895-1954), Sri Lankan Sinhala businessman, Member of Parliament for Buttala Electoral District
 M. E. Lionel Fernando, Sri Lankan Sinhala diplomat
 Lionel Fernando (cricketer), Sri Lankan cricketer
 Lloyd Fernando (1926–2008), Sri Lankan Sinhala Malaysian author and professor at the University of Malaya in the English Department
 Lushan Fernando, Sri Lankan cricketer

M
 Marcus Fernando, Ceylonese (Sri Lankan) Physician, Businessman, Philanthropist and Politician
 Mark Fernando (1941–2009), Jurist and former judge of the Supreme Court of Sri Lanka
 Meryl Fernando (1923-2007), Sri Lankan Sinhala teacher, trade unionist, and politician
 Milroy Fernando, Sri Lankan MP and government minister
 Mignonne Fernando, Sri Lankan singer, songwriter, and pianist
 Modestus Fernando, Sri Lankan Sinhala Lieutenant Colonel
 M. S. Fernando (died 1994), Sri Lankan musician

N
 Nalin Fernando, Sri Lankan politician
 Nayana Fernando (born 1988), Sri Lankan cricketer
 Nimalka Fernando, Attorney-at-law and women's rights activist from Sri Lanka
 Nisal Fernando, Sri Lankan cricketer
 Nishantha Fernando (born 1970), Sri Lankan cricketer
 Nita Fernando, Sri Lankan actress

P
 Palitha Fernando, Attorney General of Sri Lanka from 2012 - 2014
 Paul Fernando (1951-2020), Sri Lankan Sinhala baila vocalist
 Percy Fernando, Sri Lankan Army officer
 Prosper Fernando, Sri Lankan announcer with Radio Ceylon

R
 Rajiv Fernando, Sri Lankan American businessman and donor to the Clinton Foundation and the Democratic Party
 Ranjit Fernando (born 1944), Sri Lankan cricketer
 Rohan Fernando, Canadian visual artist, painter, and film maker
 Rose Fernando (born 1979), Sri Lankan cricketer

S
 Sajan Fernando, Sri Lankan cricketer
 Samantha Fernando (born 1985), Sri Lankan cricketer
 Saman Piyasiri Fernando (died 1989), Sri Lankan Janatha Vimukthi Peramuna militant
 Simon Fernando Sri Chandrasekera (1829-1908), Sri Lankan Sinhala businessman
 Sirimathi Mary Fernando (1932-1992), Sri Lankan Sinhala cinema actress
 Sujith Fernando, Sri Lankan cricketer
 Suresh Fernando (born 1986), Sri Lankan cricketer
 Susil Fernando (born 1955), Sri Lankan cricketer
 Susitha R. Fernando, Journalist and the film critic for a Sri Lankan English-language daily newspaper
 Swithin Fernando (died 2009), Former Anglican Bishop of Colombo, Sri Lanka
 Sylvia Fernando (1904-1983), Sri Lankan educator and family planning advocate

T
 Tyronne Fernando (1941–2008), Sri Lankan politician

U
 Upekha Fernando (born 1979), Sri Lankan cricketer

V
 Vijita Fernando, Sri Lankan journalist, translator, and fiction writer
 V. M. Fernando, judge of Supreme Court of Sri Lanka

W
 Wirantha Fernando (1959–2000), Sri Lankan cricketer

Fictional characters
 Fernando Sucre, fictional character from the American television series Prison Break

References

Spanish masculine given names
Portuguese masculine given names
Sinhalese surnames
Surnames of Sri Lankan origin
cs:Ferdinand
de:Ferdinand
eo:Ferdinando
it:Ferdinando (nome)
la:Ferdinandus
hu:Ferdinánd
no:Ferdinand
pl:Ferdynand
sk:Ferdinand (prvé meno)
sl:Ferdinand
fi:Ferdinand